Phymatodes nitidus is a species of longhorn beetle.  It lays its eggs on the surface of giant sequoia and coast redwood cones, into which the larvae then burrow.

References
 Thomas, H.H.; Shellhammer, H.S.; and Stecker, R.E. (1980). Giant sequoia ecology. U.S. Department of the Interior, National Park Service, Scientific Monograph Series 12. Washington, DC. 182 p.

Phymatodes
Beetles of North America
Beetles described in 1874